
The Tumulus culture (German:Hügelgräberkultur) was the dominant material culture in Central Europe during the Middle Bronze Age ( 1600 to 1300 BC).

It was the descendant of the Unetice culture. Its heartland was the area previously occupied by the Unetice culture, and its territory included parts of Germany, the Czech Republic, Austria, Switzerland, the Carpathian Basin, Poland and France. It was succeeded by the Late Bronze Age Urnfield culture.

The Tumulus culture is distinguished by the practice of burying the dead beneath burial mounds (tumuli or kurgans).

In 1902, Paul Reinecke distinguished a number of cultural horizons based on research of Bronze Age hoards and tumuli in periods covered by these cultural horizons are shown in the table below (right). The Tumulus culture was prevalent during the Bronze Age periods B, C1, and C2. Tumuli have been used elsewhere in Europe from the Stone Age to the Iron Age; the term "Tumulus culture" specifically refers to the South German variant of the Bronze Age. In the table, Ha designates Hallstatt. Archaeological horizons Hallstatt A–B are part of the Bronze Age Urnfield culture, while horizons Hallstatt C–D are the type site for the Iron Age Hallstatt culture.

The Tumulus culture was eminently a warrior society, which expanded with new chiefdoms eastward into the Carpathian Basin (up to the river Tisza), and northward into Polish and Central European Únětice territories. The culture's dispersed settlements consisted of villages or homesteads centred on fortified structures such as hillforts. Significant fortified settlements include the Heuneburg, Bullenheimer Berg, Ehrenbürg, and Bernstorf. Fortification walls were built from wood, stone and clay. The massive 3.6m-wide wall surrounding the plateau of the Ehrenbürg resembled later murus gallicus fortifications known from the Iron Age. 

Tumulus culture societies traded with those in Scandinavia, Atlantic Europe, the Mediterranean region and the Aegean. Traded items included amber and metal artefacts.

Some scholars see Tumulus groups from southern Germany as corresponding to a community that shared an extinct Indo-European linguistic entity, such as the hypothetical Italo-Celtic group that was ancestral to Italic and Celtic. This particular hypothesis, however, conflicts with suggestions by other Indo-Europeanists. For instance, David W. Anthony suggests that Proto-Italic (and perhaps also Proto-Celtic) speakers could have entered Northern Italy at an earlier stage, from the east (e.g., the Balkan/Adriatic region).

Gallery

See also

Bernstorf fortified settlement
Bronze hand of Prêles
Beaker culture
Frankleben hoard
Urnfield culture
Nordic Bronze Age
Bronze Age Britain
Argaric culture
Ottomany culture
Vatya culture
Wietenberg culture
Srubnaya culture
Mycenaean Greece
Atlantic Bronze Age

External Links

 Bronze age fortresses in Europe
 Defended sites and fortifications in Southern Germany during the Bronze Age

References
Nora Kershaw Chadwick, J. X. W. P. Corcoran, The Celts (1970), p. 27.
Barbara Ann Kipfer, Encyclopedic Dictionary of Archaeology (2000)

Specific

 
17th-century BC establishments
13th-century BC disestablishments
Culture
Archaeological cultures of Central Europe
Archaeological cultures of Western Europe
Bronze Age cultures of Europe
Archaeological cultures in Austria
Archaeological cultures in Belgium
Archaeological cultures in the Czech Republic
Archaeological cultures in France
Archaeological cultures in Germany
Archaeological cultures in Hungary
Archaeological cultures in the Netherlands
Archaeological cultures in Poland
Archaeological cultures in Slovakia
Indo-European archaeological cultures
Italo-Celtic